Johnny Greyeyes is a 2000 Canadian drama film, directed by Jorge Manzano. The film was originally planned as a documentary about indigenous women in prison, but was rewritten as a scripted drama based on the personal testimonies of women who had been interviewed.

The film stars Gail Maurice as Johnny Greyeyes, a First Nations woman who falls in love with another woman (Columpa Bobb) in prison. Its cast also includes Georgina Lightning, Jonathan Fisher, Gloria May Eshkibok, Tamara Podemski and Shirley Cheechoo.

The film premiered at the 2000 Sundance Film Festival. It was subsequently screened at the 2000 Inside Out Film and Video Festival, where it won the award for Best Canadian Film.

References

External links
 

2000 films
English-language Canadian films
Canadian prison drama films
Canadian LGBT-related films
Lesbian-related films
2000 LGBT-related films
First Nations films
LGBT First Nations culture
Women in prison films
LGBT-related drama films
2000 drama films
2000s prison drama films
2000s English-language films
2000s Canadian films